Thomas Rose may refer to:

 Thomas G. Rose (1901–1979), English cricketer 
 Thomas M. Rose (born 1948), U.S. federal judge
 Thomas Rose (RAF officer) (1895–1968), British flying ace
 Thomas Rose (died 1837), publican and pioneer settler in colonial Sydney
 Thomas Rose (politician) (1856–1926), Australian politician
 Thomas Rose (died 1747) of Wootton Fitzpaine, Sheriff of Dorset in 1715